Kim Sung-jae (Hangul: 김성재; Hanja: 金成宰; April 18, 1972 – November 20, 1995) was a South Korean singer, rapper, dancer, and model, best known as a member of Deux, an influential early K-pop and Korean hip hop group that rose to fame in the early 1990s. Sungjae died of an apparent murder in 1995 at the age of 23. His girlfriend was convicted of his murder and sentenced to life in prison but was later acquitted on appeal. In 2019, Sungjae's girlfriend filed multiple injunctions to block SBS's investigative program, I Want To Know, from airing an episode covering Sungjae's death.

Death 
Several months after Deux broke up, SungJae  released his debut solo album, As I Told You, on November 19, 1995. He performed the album's title track the same day on an SBS music program and then returned to his hotel room with his girlfriend and members of his entourage. He was found dead in his hotel room the next day, and police ruled the cause of death a heart attack caused by karoshi, or overworking. However, 28 needle marks were later discovered on his right arm, and an autopsy found traces of an animal anesthetic in his body. Sungjae's girlfriend was convicted for his murder and sentenced to life in prison, but was later acquitted due to "lack of evidence."

Aftermath
In 2019, Sungjae's girlfriend filed multiple injunctions to block SBS from airing an episode regarding Sungjae's death on the investigative program, I Want To Know.

On September 7, 2022, a virtual avatar of Kim Sung-jae was unveiled by Persona Space and Galaxy Corporation, performing "As I Told You" with Sungjae's mother and brother in attendance.

Discography

With Deux

Solo album: 김성재 (Kim Sung-jae), (1995)  
 Intro 0:59
 말하자면 (As I Told You)  3:35 Title Track 
 마지막 노래를 들어줘 3:53
작지만 큰 행복 3:41
더 이상은 3:17
너의 생일 3:31
도전! 3:13
Let's Dance 3:28
봄을 기다리며 3:33
염세주의자 3:17
Hip Hop 정신 (精神) (Feat. 이현도) 5:07

See also 
 Deux

References 

1972 births
1995 deaths
Rappers from Seoul
Singers from Seoul
South Korean male singers
South Korean pop singers
South Korean male rappers
South Korean Buddhists
20th-century male musicians
People murdered in South Korea